The South Fork Spring River (commonly South Fork of the Spring River or simply South Fork River) is a tributary of the Spring River, roughly  long, in southern Missouri and northern Arkansas in the United States. The river flows through the Salem Plateau of the Ozarks and it is part of the Spring River Tributaries Watershed.

The South Fork rises in Howell County northeast of the unincorporated community of South Fork and southwest of West Plains. The river flows generally southeast from Howell County through Fulton County before joining with the Spring River in Sharp County west of Hardy.

References

Rivers of Missouri
Rivers of Arkansas
Bodies of water of the Ozarks
Rivers of Howell County, Missouri
Rivers of Fulton County, Arkansas
Bodies of water of Sharp County, Arkansas
Tributaries of the White River (Arkansas–Missouri)